Nurul Hana binti Che Mahazan (born July 1, 1983), better known by her stage name Nana Mahazan, is an actress, television host, radio announcer and singer. She came in seventh place on the first season of Akademi Fantasia in 2003. Even though she did not win, she became a successful Malaysian singer and actor.

She used to write a column called "Bicara Nana" ("Nana's Discussion") in Harian Metro on Sundays. Nana appeared in a Soy Talk advertisement and as of 2012 she was the product's ambassador. She was a popular DJ at one of Malaysia's most popular radio stations, Era.fm. In 2004, she hosted an Era segment called "Petang di Era" (Evening@Era) with Seelan Paul. She extended her contract with Era from 2005 to 2006, and hosted "Pagi@Era with Adi" and various segments including "Carta Era" (Era Charts) with Aznil.

In November 2009, Nana shifted to another radio station, XFM.

Biography 
She was born Nurul Hana Binti Che Mahazan. She is of Malay descent. She is the second of four siblings in a middle-class family. Her elder brother plays guitar while the younger one plays drum.

Nana married Mohamed Raqeem Brian Abdullah, a manager of Hitz.fm radio station, on 6 June 2009, in her hometown in Muar, Johor.

Akademi fantasia
Nana was the 7th student to be voted out of 12 students in the academy.

Discography 
 Album Evolusi 1

Filmography

Film

Television

Awards and nominations

References

External links 
Official site

1983 births
Living people
Malaysian actresses
Malaysian radio announcers
Malaysian voice actresses
21st-century Malaysian women singers
Malaysian people of Malay descent
Malaysian Muslims
People from Muar
Malay-language singers
People from Johor
Akademi Fantasia participants